HASD may refer to:
 Halifax Area School District
 Hazleton Area School District
 Hempfield Area School District
 Hortonville Area School District
 Huntingdon Area School District